, literally, Naked Blood: Mischief, is a 1996 Japanese horror film directed by Hisayasu Satō. It is a remake of Satō's 1987 film, and, according to AllMovie, "contains one of the most appalling scenes in Japanese horror."

Plot
A scientist named Eiji has developed a new chemical called "MySon" that can turn pain into pleasure and also drastically increases the pain threshold of those who receive the drug, causing them to become immune to pain. He decides to put three girls who attend a different experiment held by Eiji's mother—this experiment involving a clinical trial of a soon-to-be-released contraceptive—to the test. Meanwhile, Eiji has a crush on one of the girls, Rika. MySon influences the girls gradually, and Eiji discovers that his experiment is going horribly wrong when he finds out the drug results in too many endorphines being produced in the bodies of the people who take it when they become injured, causing them to inflict greater and greater harm on themselves to experience the same amount of pleasure. Nevertheless, Eiji continues with the experiment to observe what happens next.

The first woman, who regularly indulges in gluttony, wishes to have the best food in the world, but she ends up cooking and consuming various parts of her body, notably, her labia. The second woman, who is extremely vain and self-conscious, wishes to have the thinnest and most beautiful body in the world. However, noticing hairs and pores all over her body, she tries to mutilate herself, piercing her skin all over with needles and jewellery before Rika intervenes. Shortly afterwards, both the first and second of the three women are found dead.

Rika does not seem to be influenced by MySon, but Eiji finds out that it has turned her into a homicidal murderer who gets enjoyment from witnessing the pain and suffering of her victims, and that she killed the other two girls and his mother. The two engage in sexual intercourse, but Rika then stabs Eiji to death.

Eiji's mother is frequently visited by his father in the afterlife. Eventually, he pulls open her abdomen (which was cut open previously by Rika) and climbs inside. In the final scene, set several years later, Rika and her young son, also named Eiji, have apparently perfected MySon, and depart on a motorcycle to administer a vaporised version of the drug to the population of a city.

Cast
 Misa Aika as Rika
 Yumika Hayashi as Gluttonous Woman
 Mika Kirihara as  Vain Woman
 Sadao Abe as Eiji Kure 
 Masumi Nakao as Yuki Kure, Eiji's mother 
 Tadashi Shiraishi as Eiji's father 
 Seiya Hiramatsu as Eiji, the son of Eiji Kure and Rika

See also
 Japanese horror

Notes

Bibliography

External links
 
 

1996 horror films
1996 films
Films directed by Hisayasu Satō
Body horror films
Japanese psychological horror films
Japanese horror thriller films
Japanese psychological thriller films
Japanese splatter films
Discotek Media
1990s Japanese-language films
1990s Japanese films